Yukarıçavuş can refer to:

 Yukarıçavuş, Çankırı
 Yukarıçavuş, Yenice